Kamalabad (also Romanized as Kamālābād) is a village in Kezab Rural District, Khezrabad District, Saduq County, Yazd Province, Iran. At the 2006 census, its population was 37, in 10 families.

References 

Populated places in Saduq County